North Uist is an island and community in the Outer Hebrides of Scotland.

Etymology
In Donald Munro's A Description of the Western Isles of Scotland Called Hybrides of 1549, North Uist, Benbecula and South Uist are described as one island of Ywst (Uist). Starting in the south of this 'island', he described the division between South Uist and Benbecula where "the end heirof the sea enters, and cuts the countrey be ebbing and flowing through it". Further north of Benbecula he described North Uist as "this countrey is called Kenehnache of Ywst, that is in Englishe, the north head of Ywst".

Some have taken the etymology of Uist from Old Norse, meaning "west", much like Westray in Orkney.

A Gaelic etymology is also possible, with  meaning "Crossings-island" or "Fords-island", derived from  meaning "island" and  meaning "estuary, sand-bank, passage across at ebb-tide". Place-names derived from  include Fersit, and Belfast.  (2003) suggests that a Gaelic derivation of Uist may be "corn island". However, whilst noting that the  ending would have been familiar to speakers of Old Norse as meaning "dwelling", Gammeltoft (2007) says the word is "of non-Gaelic origin" and that it reveals itself as one of a number of "foreign place-names having undergone adaptation in Old Norse". In contrast, Clancy (2018) has argued that Ívist itself is an Old Norse calque on an earlier Gaelic name, Ibuid or Ibdaig, which corresponds to Ptolemy’s Eboudai.

History

Early history

A number of standing stones from the Neolithic period are scattered throughout the island, including a stone circle at Pobull Fhinn. In addition to these, a large burial cairn, in almost pristine condition, is located at Barpa Langass. The island remained inhabited for at least part of the Bronze Age; a burial from this period was found on the Udal peninsula (near Sollas). For the Iron Age, in addition to the wheelhouses typical of the Outer Hebrides, the remains of a broch, from the late Iron Age, can be found at Dun an Sticir; there was formerly another broch near Scolpaig, but it was replaced by Scolpaig Tower in the 19th century. In the 3rd century, stone houses came into use which were shaped like Jelly Babies.

Kingdom of the Isles

Whoever the occupants of "Jelly Baby" houses were, they were followed in the 9th century by Viking settlers, who established the Kingdom of the Isles throughout the Hebrides. Initially, Vikings built turf-based buildings; however, on the shore, the environmental and chemical composition of machair causes these buildings to rapidly degrade and turn mauve. Following Norwegian unification, the Kingdom of the Isles became a crown dependency of the Norwegian king; to the Norwegians it was Suðreyjar (meaning "southern isles"). Malcolm III of Scotland acknowledged in writing that Suðreyjar was not Scottish, and King Edgar quitclaimed any residual doubts.

However, in the mid-12th century, Somerled, a Norse-Gael of uncertain origin, launched a coup, which made Suðreyjar entirely independent. Following his death, Norwegian authority was nominally restored, but in practice, the kingdom was divided between Somerled's heirs (Clann Somhairle), and the dynasty that Somerled had deposed (the Crovan dynasty). The MacRory, a branch of Somerled's heirs, ruled Uist, as well as Barra, Eigg, Rùm, the Rough Bounds, Bute, Arran, and northern Jura.

In the 13th century, despite Edgar's quitclaim, Scottish forces attempted to conquer parts of Suðreyjar, culminating in the indecisive Battle of Largs.

In 1266, the matter was settled by the Treaty of Perth, which transferred the whole of Suðreyjar to Scotland, in exchange for a very large sum of money. The treaty expressly preserved the status of the rulers of Suðreyjar; the MacRory lands, excepting Bute, Arran, and Jura, became the Lordship of Garmoran, a quasi-independent crown dependency, rather than an intrinsic part of Scotland.

Lordship of Garmoran

At the turn of the century, William I had created the position of Sheriff of Inverness, to be responsible for the Scottish highlands, which theoretically now extended to Garmoran. In 1293, however, King John Balliol established the Sheriffdom of Skye, which included the Outer Hebrides. Nevertheless, following his usurpation, the Skye sheriffdom ceased to be mentioned, and the Garmoran lordship (including Uist) was confirmed to the MacRory leader. In 1343, King David II issued a further charter for this to the latter's son.

In 1346, just three years later, the sole surviving MacRory heir was Amy of Garmoran. The southern parts of the Kingdom of the Isles had become the Lordship of the Isles, ruled by the MacDonalds (another group of Somerled's descendants). Amy married the MacDonald leader, John of Islay, but a decade later he divorced her, and married the king's niece instead (in return for a substantial dowry). As part of the divorce, John deprived his eldest son, Ranald, of the ability to inherit the Lordship of the Isles, in favour of a son by his new wife. As compensation, John granted Lordship of the Uists to Ranald's younger brother Godfrey, and made Ranald Lord of the remainder of Garmoran.

However, on Ranald's death, his sons were still children, and Godfrey took the opportunity to seize the Lordship of Garmoran. Furthermore, Godfrey had a younger brother, Murdoch, whose heirs (the Siol Murdoch) now claimed to own part of North Uist. This led to a great deal of violent conflict involving Godfrey's family (the Siol Gorrie) and those of his brothers. Surviving records do not describe this in detail, but traditional accounts report an incident where the Siol Gorrie dug away the embankment of a Loch, causing it to flood a nearby village in which the Siol Murdoch lived (and hence drown them); the accounts claim that the floodwater formed Loch Hosta.

In 1427, frustrated with the level of violence generally in the highlands, together with the insurrection caused by his own cousin, King James I demanded that highland magnates should attend a meeting at Inverness. On arrival, many of the leaders were seized and imprisoned. Alexander MacGorrie, son of Godfrey, was considered to be one of the two most reprehensible, and after a quick show trial, was immediately executed. As Alexander had by now inherited Godfrey's de facto position as Lord of Garmoran, and in view of Ranald's heirs being no less responsible for the violence, King James declared the Lordship forfeit.

Early lairds

Hugh of Sleat and his sons

Following the forfeiture, most of Garmoran (including North Uist) remained with the Scottish crown until 1469, when James III granted Lairdship of it to John of Ross, the Lord of the Isles. In turn, John passed it to his own half-brother, Hugh of Sleat; the grant to Hugh was confirmed by the king – James IV – in a 1493 charter, but Ranald's heirs (Clan Ranald) disputed the charter.

Hugh died a few years later, and in 1505 his eldest son, John, granted North Uist (and Sleat) to Ranald Bane, the Captain of Clanranald; the reasons John had for this are not reported by surviving records. Nevertheless, Hugh's second son, Donald Gallach, opposed Clan Ranald and established his own de facto control of North Uist and Sleat. In the following year (1506), Donald was stabbed to death by his own younger brother – Black Archibald. The king authorised Ranald Bane to take the lands by force; according to traditional accounts, Ranald Bane's success led to Black Archibald resorting to piracy.

Three years later, however, Black Archibald returned. Traditional accounts relate that while he had been away, Angus Collach (Archibald's other brother) attempted to rape a woman on North Uist; outraged by this, an armed party made up of men from the Siol Gorrie (to which the woman belonged) and Clan Ranald (to which her husband belonged) captured Angus and drowned him at sea. According to these accounts, Black Archibald now took revenge, killing large numbers of Siol Gorrie. Despite his behaviour, Black Archibald managed to ingratiate himself with James IV, by capturing and handing over two pirates – distant relations from Clan MacAlister; in 1511, the king rewarded Black Archibald by pardoning him for his crimes, and confirming his possession of Sleat and North Uist.

The Hunchback

At some point before 1520, Black Archibald was murdered by Donald Gallach's son, Donald Gruamach. Consequently, in 1520, James IV issued a charter awarding lairdship of Sleat and North Uist to Alasdair Crotach MacLeod, the leader of the Sìol Tormoid, who possessed the neighbouring lands, and had been loyal to James during Donald Dubh's rebellion.

In 1539, Donald Gruamach's son – Donald Gorm – invaded the Siol Tormoid lands on Skye, in an attempt to take back Sleat and North Uist. However, that same year, Donald Gorm was hit by an arrow while besieging Eilean Donan castle; in the process of removing it, he severed an artery, and died. In 1542, king James V issued a charter confirming Alastair Crotach as laird of Sleat and North Uist.

Mary MacLeod

After the deaths of Alastair Crotach and his son William in quick succession (1547, and 1553, respectively), Alastair's heir was his young granddaughter, Mary MacLeod. Donald Gormson, Donald Gorm's son, took the opportunity to seize Sleat and North Uist. The Earl of Arran, regent to Mary, Queen of Scots, assigned nominal feudal wardship of her to the Earl of Huntly, who himself proposed to sell it to the Earl of Argyll. Following Arran's death in 1554, Mary of Guise was appointed regent for her daughter and issued Argyll and Huntly with a "commission of fire and sword" against Donald Gormson and Clan Ranald, instructing the earls to pursue their "utter extermination".

However, the forces of the Earl of Huntly had previously been defeated by Clan Ranald at the Battle of the Shirts, which made them reluctant to enter Clan Ranald territory; the Earl abandoned the pursuit, but was promptly imprisoned by Mary of Guise for doing so. Three years later, the Lords of the Congregation, the Earl of Argyll among them, emerged as an organised resistance to the Queen Regent. By 1562, the Earl of Huntly, now released, was in outright opposition to Queen Mary, and died opposing her at the Battle of Corrichel. In 1565 the tables turned when Donald Gormson took the queen's side during the Chaseabout Raid and was consequently back in royal favour.

On 4 March 1567 Donald Gormson and the Earl of Argyll drew up a contract, according to which:
Donald Gormson would enter a bond of manrent to the Earl of Argyll
Donald Gormson would provide military aid to Mary MacLeod's uncle, on demand from the Earl of Argyll
Mary MacLeod would quitclaim her rights to Sleat and North Uist in return for 500 marks, to be paid by Donald Gormson
The Earl of Argyll would persuade Queen Mary to grant him a charter for those lands, and subinfeudate them to Donald Gormson, in return for 1000 marks

Old Blue-eyes

In 1594, as an opponent of The Reformation, Donald Gorm Mor – Donald Gormson's grandson – sent troops to support Tyrone's rebellion against the Queen Elizabeth of England. In 1596, concerned by this, and similar action by other highland leaders, King James VI of Scotland (Elizabeth's heir) demanded that highland leaders send well-armed men, as well as attending themselves, to meet him at Dumbarton on 1 August. Donald Gorm Mor obeyed the summons, and was consequently pardoned for previous offences, and granted a charter which acknowledged him as rightful heir of Hugh of Sleat, and confirmed him as laird of Sleat and North Uist.

In an attempt to solidify peaceful relations with the Siol Tormoid, Donald Gorm Mor married the daughter of the then Siol Tormoid leader, Rory Mor. Unfortunately, the marriage failed catastrophically, leading to the War of the One-Eyed Woman. A series of initial skirmishes led to the Battle of Carinish in North Uist, the last battle in Scotland that involved bows and arrows. It led to the Battle of Coire Na Creiche, where Donald Gorm Mor won a more decisive victory, at which point the privy council intervened, and imposed a lasting peace. Donald was succeeded by his nephew, Donald Gorm Og, whose loyalty to the king resulted in him being made the first Baronet of Sleat.

Post-union

The Papists Act

A century later, Sir Donald MacDonald, the 4th Baronet of Sleat, was living comfortably in Glasgow. In 1715, he supported the Jacobite rebellion and attacked the Earl of Sutherland, but fell ill and fled to Skye. He was pursued and forced to flee to North Uist. When the Papists Act was passed the following year, requiring his attendance at Inverlochy, he argued that he was too ill to travel, but magistrates could visit him instead. Under the terms of the act, this made him a recusant, and his lairdships were accordingly forfeited, under the  terms of the Forfeited Estates Act of the previous year.

The Commissioners of Forfeited Estates surveyed the land and found that it was in very poor condition; in North Uist, the local population had recently lost 745 cows, 573 horses, and 820 sheep to plague, and the sea had overflowed the land and destroyed many houses. On his succession in 1723, the 7th baronet arranged for a middleman, Kenneth MacKenzie, to buy back Sleat and North Uist from the Commissioners and pass them on to him. In 1727, the 7th baronet was granted a royal charter formally acknowledging his position as laird of the Sleat and North Uist.

According to historian John Lorne Campbell, Sir Alexander MacDonald of Sleat and his clan took no part in the Jacobite Uprising of 1745, but they were included in the repression of Highland dress and culture that followed the Battle of Culloden. However, North Uist bard Iain Mac Fhearchair (John MacCodrum), the official poet to the chief, wrote the satirical poem "Òran an Aghaidh an Eididh Ghallda" ("A Song Against the Lowland Garb"), which "shows clearly where his own sympathies lay".

MacCodrum also composed poetry criticizing both the Scottish clan chiefs and the Anglo-Scottish landlords of the Highlands and Islands for the often brutal mass evictions of the Scottish Gaels that followed the Battle of Culloden and on mundane topics such as old age and whiskey.

Among MacCodrum's most popular anti-landlord poems mocks Aonghus MacDhòmhnaill, the post-Culloden tacksman of Griminish. It is believed to date from between 1769 and 1773, when overwhelming numbers of Sir Alexander MacDonald's tenants on the isles of North Uist and Skye were reacting to his rackrenting and other harsh treatments by immigrating to the region surrounding the Cape Fear River in North Carolina. The song is known in the oral tradition of North Uist as Òran Fir Ghriminis ("A Song of the Tacksman of Griminish"). The song is equally popular among speakers of Canadian Gaelic in Nova Scotia, where it is known under the differing title, Òran Aimereaga ("The Song of America").

Kelp

During the French Revolutionary Wars, the scarcity of external supplies of minerals to the United Kingdom led to a boom in the kelp industry, which became North Uist's main source of income. When the war ended, the availability of foreign mineral supplies led to an abrupt collapse in the demand for kelp-based products. The burning of kelp had also damaged the fertility of the land. As a result, the crofters of North Uist could no longer afford the rents. Even though the landlords reduced the rents (e.g. in 1827 the rents were reduced by 20%) many crofters resorted to emigration.

In 1826 the villages of Kyles Berneray, Baile Mhic Coinein, and Baile Mhic Phàil, at the north-east corner of North Uist, were abandoned by their inhabitants. Although some moved further south-east to Loch Portain, most of those affected moved to Cape Breton, in Nova Scotia. As the economic conditions worsened, and with reports of islanders having success overseas, the numbers of families emigrating from Scotland to North America greatly increased. By 1838, the number of people having left North Uist was reported as 1,300; before the 1820s, the population of North Uist had been almost 5,000, but by 1841 it had fallen to 3,870.

The Highland Clearances

The 7th baronet's heir, Godfrey MacDonald (the 4th Baron of Slate) ran sheep on the abandoned crofts. The land was poor for farming but sufficient to sustain sheep, bringing the baron a better profit. As a result, he orchestrated one of the most notable mass evictions of the Highland Clearances. In 1849, an attempt to evict 603 crofters from Sollas caused rioting. Rocks were reportedly thrown at the police officers sent from Glasgow to quell the riot. In the convictions that followed, the jury added the following written comments:

In 1855, Sir Godfrey decided to sell North Uist to Sir John Powlett Orde.

According to Bill Lawson, "The MacDonalds of Sleat possessed the island from 1469 until 1855, though the later proprietors took little interest in their estate except as a source of income. In 1855 the Lord MacDonald of the day sold the island to Sir John Powlett Orde, who had gained the reputation of being the worst type of landlord, utterly opposed to any attempt to improve the lot of his tenants, though it is only fair to point out that every one of the major evictions on the island was in fact carried out by the MacDonalds; they, being of a local source, are forgiven, and the blame is reserved for the incoming Sir John. He, in turn, sold parts of the island to his son Sir Arthur Campbell-Orde, mainly in order to frustrate the terms of the Crofter's Acts, which could have allowed crofters to apply for more land, but only on land with the same ownership. Sir Arthur eventually inherited the whole estate; he seems to have been a very different type of landlord, and was involved in the re-crofting of Sollas and other areas."

The pre-clearance population of North Uist was about 5,000. Families particularly depleted during the clearances were the MacAulays, Morrisons, MacCodrums, MacCuishs, and MacDonalds.

Modern times

In 1889, counties were formally created in Scotland, on shrieval boundaries, by a dedicated Local Government Act; North Uist, therefore, became part of the new county of Inverness. Following late 20th century reforms, it became part of the Highland Region.

In 1944, the Campbell-Orde family sold North Uist to Douglas Douglas-Hamilton, 14th Duke of Hamilton, who in 1960 sold it in turn to the 5th Earl Granville, and the current laird is Fergus Leveson-Gower, 6th Earl Granville, who lives on the island. The Granville family administers the island through a trust fund called the North Uist Trust.

Some of the machair townships, however, were taken over by the Board of Agriculture and its successors.

The population of North Uist has dwindled to around 1,300.

Geology 
In common with the rest of the Western Isles, North Uist is formed from the oldest rocks in Britain, the Lewisian gneiss which dates from the Archaean eon.  A zone running west from Lochmaddy to Baleshare has abundant metasediments and metavolcanics. The direction of inclination of layered textures or foliation in this metamorphic rock is typically to the north but varies widely across the island. Pockets of metabasic rocks equivalent to the Scourie dyke suite are developed in certain areas, particularly in the north. Banded metabasic rocks and Archaean granites are found in the northwest around Loch Phaibeil. A band of pseudotachylyte curves north the northwest through the centre of the island.
The island is traversed by numerous normal faults many of which run broadly NW-SE though ranging from E-W to NNW-SSE. Loch Eport is developed along one such fault. The Outer Hebrides Thrust Zone runs along the eastern coast of the island and brings distinctive gneisses which form the rough hilly terrain along that coast.  More recent geological deposits include blown sand along the northern and western coasts and peat inland.

Geography
North Uist is the tenth-largest Scottish island and the thirteenth-largest island surrounding Great Britain. North Uist is connected by causeways to Benbecula via Grimsay, to Berneray, and to Baleshare. With the exception of the south east, the island is very flat, and covered with a patchwork of peat bogs, low hills and lochans, with more than half the land being covered by water. Some of the lochs contain a mixture of fresh and tidal salt water, giving rise to some complex and unusual habitats. Loch Sgadabhagh, about which it has been said "there is probably no other loch in Britain which approaches Loch Scadavay in irregularity and complexity of outline", is the largest loch by area on North Uist although Loch Obisary has about twice the volume of water. The northern part of the island is part of the South Lewis, Harris and North Uist National Scenic Area, one of 40 in Scotland.

Settlements

Caledonian MacBrayne ferries sail from the village to Uig on Skye, as well as from the island of Berneray (which is connected to North Uist by road causeway), to Leverburgh in Harris. Lochmaddy also has the Taigh Chearsabhagh — a museum and arts centre with a cafe, small shop and post office service. Nearby is the Uist Outdoor Centre.

The island's main villages are Sollas, Hosta, Tigharry, Hougharry, Paible, Grimsay and Cladach Kirkibost. Other settlements include Clachan Carinish, Knockquien, Port nan Long, Greinetobht and Scolpaig, home to the nineteenth-century Scolpaig Tower folly.

According to the 2011 census North Uist had a population of 1,254.

Places of interest
North Uist has many prehistoric structures, including the Barpa Langass chambered cairn, the Pobull Fhinn stone circle, the Fir Bhreige standing stones, Eilean Dòmhnuill (which may be the earliest crannog site in Scotland), and the Baile Sear roundhouses, which were exposed by storms in January 2005.

The Vikings arrived in the Hebrides in AD 800 and developed large settlements.

The island is known for its bird life, including corncrakes, Arctic terns, gannets, corn buntings and Manx shearwaters. The RSPB has a nature reserve at Balranald.

Population
In the 18th century, the total population of the combined Uists rose dramatically, before the population crash of the Highland Clearances. In 1755, the Uists' estimated combined population was 4,118; by 1794 it rose to 6,668; and in 1821 to 11,009.

From Haswell-Smith (2004) except as stated.

Gaelic
According to the 2011 Census, there are 887 Gaelic speakers (61%) on North Uist.

Literature
The False Men by Mhairead MacLeod, author. The novel is set in North Uist during the era of the Highland Clearances when all residents of the townships around Sollas were forcibly evicted resulting in the Battle of Sollas.
 Iain Mac Fhearchair (alias John MacCodrum) (1693-1779) was a Scottish Gaelic poet who spent his life as the "family bard to Sir James MacDonald of Sleat". One of his most popular songs is "Smeòrach Chlann Dòmhnaill" ("The Mavis of Clan Donald"), in which the bard "praises the isle of his birth". The song was recorded by fellow North Uist native Julie Fowlis on her 2014 album Gach sgeul – Every story.
 The war poet Dòmhnall Ruadh Chorùna (1887–1967), a major figure in 20th-century Scottish Gaelic literature, was born on North Uist and lived his life there. Due to his vivid descriptions of his combat experiences during the First World War, he is often referred to as "The Voice of the Trenches".
 Pauline Prior-Pitt, a British poet, lives on North Uist.
 Sollas beach on North Just is featured in the novel The Chessmen by Peter May.

Notable residents
 Erskine Beveridge, LL.D., FRSE (1851–1920), a textile manufacturer and antiquary and sometime resident of Vallay, completed important archaeological excavations in the Hebrides.
 Julie Fowlis (born 1979), a singer and instrumentalist who sings primarily in Scottish Gaelic, was born and raised on North Uist.
 Alasdair Morrison (born 1968), former Member of the Scottish Parliament for the Western Isles, lived on North Uist and was educated at Paible School.
 Flight Lieutenant John Morrison, 2nd Viscount Dunrossil, CMG, JP (1926–2000), diplomat and Governor of Bermuda, lived at Clachan Sands.
 Brothers Rory and Calum MacDonald, members of the Gaelic rock band Runrig.
 Angus MacAskill (1825–1863), "true giant" and strong man from Berneray, off North Uist.
 Donald Macdonald (1825–1901), a founding minister of the Free Presbyterian Church of Scotland, was born at Langass on North Uist.
 Brothers Angus Matheson (1912–1962), inaugural Professor of Celtic at the University of Glasgow, and William Matheson (1910-1995), a Scottish Gaelic scholar, academic, and ordained minister of the Church of Scotland.
Fergus Leveson-Gower, 6th Earl Granville (born 1959), laird, lives at Callernish House, near Lochmaddy

In popular culture
The penultimate segment of "Lochdown", the 41st episode (3rd episode of 4th season) of the popular motoring television series The Grand Tour, was filmed on a narrow straight close to Griminish, at the northwest corner of the island, with the presenters building a floating bridge to drive their cars across to the island of Vallay (unlike suggested in the episode, the last segment was filmed in Swindon, not on Vallay).

See also

 List of islands of Scotland

Notes

References

Bibliography
 Ballin Smith, Beverley; Taylor, Simon; and Williams, Gareth (2007) West over Sea: Studies in Scandinavian Sea-Borne Expansion and Settlement Before 1300. Leiden. Brill.

External links
 
 Balranald Nature Reserve
 
 Explore North Uist
 Am Paipear Community Newspaper
 

 
Uist islands
Islands of the Outer Hebrides
Cleared places in the Outer Hebrides
Ramsar sites in Scotland